The Progressive Valdostan Union (Union Valdôtaine Progressiste, UVP) was a social-democratic Italian political party active in Aosta Valley.

History
It emerged in 1973 as a split from the Valdostan Union and won 6.7% of the vote in that year’s regional election. After a decline in term of votes (3.1% in 1978), UVP joined forces with the Popular Democrats in the 1983 regional election, winning 10.4%. In 1984 the two parties merged to form the Progressive Democratic Autonomists.

The leaders of the party included Bruno Salvadori, whose federalist ideas strongly influenced Umberto Bossi, founder and leader of Lega Nord.

References

Political parties in Aosta Valley
Political parties established in 1973
Political parties disestablished in 1984

it:Union Valdôtaine Progressiste